The Heath Is Green is a 1932 German musical film directed by Hans Behrendt and starring Camilla Spira, Peter Voß and Theodor Loos. Three men go on holiday to a cabin in the middle of a heath. Soon growing bored they venture out to investigate their surroundings.

It was based on the novel by Hermann Löns which was made into further films in 1951 and in 1972. The film was partly shot on Lüneburg Heath.

Plot 
The young forester Walter wants to catch a dangerous poacher in the Lüneburg Heath. He pursues a man into the house of the landowner Lüdersen and meets his daughter Grete. Grete discovers that her father, who used to own the whole area, is the poacher. She asks him to move into town with her.

Walter can't catch the poacher. Chief Forester Schliepemann then has the whole area surrounded. The traveling trader Specht is arrested as a poacher. Lüdersen had surprised Specht and was fatally wounded by him. He dies putting Grete's hand in Walter's.

Cast
  Camilla Spira as Grete Lüdersen
 Peter Voß as Walter - Ein junger Förster
 Theodor Loos as Lüder Lüdersen
 Fritz Kampers as Alois
 Hugo Werner-Kahle as Der Oberförster
 Paul Beckers as Blümchen
 Karl Blume as Nachtigall
 Fritz Odemar
 Alfred Beierle
 Gerhard Bienert
 Gerhard Dammann
 Bruno Ziener
 Kurt Meißner
 Ida Krill

External links

1932 films
1932 musical films
1930s German-language films
Films directed by Hans Behrendt
Films about hunters
Films of the Weimar Republic
German black-and-white films
German musical films
1930s German films